Janus Adams (born January 11, 1947) is an American journalist, author/historian, talk show host, publisher/producer, and creator of BackPax children’s media.

Biography 
As a journalist, Adams' radio and TV talk shows aired for ten years, and her syndicated column ran for sixteen years. Her Master's degree from Mills College in Pan-African Culture was the nation's first graduate degree awarded in Black studies. She was NPR's first National Arts Correspondent, and currently hosts The Janus Adams Show on  public radio station WJFF-FM. She is a frequent television commentator and public speaker.

Books 
 A Mystical Journey Into Cajun Country (BackPax, 1986)
 Journey to the Moon -- and Beyond (BackPax, 1988)
 Traveling Mark Twain's America (BackPax, 1988)
 Escape to Freedom: Underground Railroad (BackPax, 1988)
 Routes 'n Roots: An Explorer's Guide to America (BackPax, 1988)
 Glory Days (Harper Perennial, 1996)
 Freedom Days : 365 inspired moments in civil rights history (Wiley, 1998)
 Way to Go! The BackPax Parents' Guide to Empowering Adventurous Young Minds (BackPax, 2014)

Radio 
 The Janus Adams Show (WJFF-FM, 2016–present)
 The Tavis Smiley Show (NPR, 2002 - 2004)

References

External links
 

1947 births
Living people
American women journalists
American women columnists
American talk radio hosts
Mills College alumni
NPR personalities
American women radio presenters
American women historians
20th-century American historians
20th-century American journalists
20th-century American women writers
21st-century American historians
21st-century American journalists
21st-century American women writers
American women non-fiction writers